The Drug Price Competition and Patent Term Restoration Act (Public Law 98-417), informally known as the Hatch-Waxman Act, is a 1984 United States federal law that encourages the manufacture of generic drugs by the pharmaceutical industry and established the modern system of government generic drug regulation in the United States. Representative Henry Waxman of California and Senator Orrin Hatch of Utah sponsored the act.

Background
Although the Federal Food, Drug, and Cosmetic Act made it possible for generic companies to get regulatory approval for drugs by filing an Abbreviated New Drug Application (ANDA), in the early 1980s it became clear that very few generics were coming to market. Congress studied the issue and realized that under patent and regulatory law, it was easy for innovator companies to make it difficult for generic companies to successfully file ANDAs and that the regulatory pathway to get ANDAs approved was irregular and uncertain.  In response, the Hatch-Waxman Act was negotiated and enacted.

Provisions
Hatch-Waxman amended the Federal Food, Drug, and Cosmetic Act. Section 505(j) of the Act, codified as 21 U.S.C. § 355(j), outlines the process for pharmaceutical manufacturers to file an Abbreviated New Drug Application (ANDA) for approval of a generic drug by the Food and Drug Administration (FDA).

The Act gives drug innovators some protection while facilitating and providing incentives for companies to file ANDAs.

Drug innovators were given protections in two ways. First, a new kind of market exclusivity was introduced, by means of a new five-year period of data exclusivity awarded when the FDA approves marketing of a drug that is a new chemical entity; during that period the FDA cannot approve a generic version of the drug. This provides market exclusivity for the drug innovator outside of any patent rights. Second, the Act allows the life of patents covering a drug to be extended by a portion of the time the drug is under regulatory review by the FDA, ensuring that regulatory review will not unduly consume patent life. The Act also requires the drug innovator to give the FDA the numbers of patents it believes cover its drug; the FDA does not evaluate whether the patents cover the drug, but publicly lists them in the Orange Book, and these are the patents the life of which is extended if there are regulatory delays.

The Act facilitates the filing of ANDAs by generic companies by preventing the FDA from asking a generic company to provide anything other than information on how it is going to manufacture the drug, quality assurance, and a study showing that the drug acts the same in a human as the innovator drug; this is called bioequivalence. This part of the Act is one of few pieces of legislation that restricts the powers and reach of a federal agency. The Act also gives generic companies safe harbor from patent infringement lawsuits during the time when the generic company is preparing its ANDA; during that time the generic company needs to learn how to manufacture the drug, manufacture a test batch, and run bioequivalence studies, all activities for which it could be sued for infringement. This protection is called the research exemption.

When a company is ready to file its ANDA, the Act requires it to declare how its activities when it begins to market the drug will relate to patents listed in the Orange Book; there are four options, or "certifications": it can state that there never were patents listed, that listed patents have expired, that it will not market the drug until all the patents listed in the Orange Book have expired, or that it believes the patents in the Orange Book are not relevant or are invalid. These four alternatives are called the Paragraph I, II, III, and IV certifications (named after Section 505(j)(2)(A)(vii)(IV)). The Act incentivizes companies to file paragraph IV certifications by rewarding the first company to file an ANDA with such a certification with 180 days of administrative exclusivity if their ANDA is approved; during that period the FDA cannot approve another generic. Because the Act also makes clear that filing an ANDA with a paragraph IV certification is an act of patent infringement, the law actually promotes litigation between private parties; the innovator is prompted to commence patent enforcement litigation against the generic infringer, and the generic company is incentivized to file a countersuit to have the patents listed in the Orange Book declared invalid.

Consequences
Passage of the law prompted a gold rush into the generic industry and a crush of applications, which the FDA was not prepared to handle.  A series of scandals soon arose that shook public confidence in generic drugs; there were several instances in which companies obtained bioequivalence data fraudulently, by using the branded drug in their tests instead of their own product, and a congressional investigation found corruption at the FDA, where employees were accepting bribes to approve some generic companies' applications and delaying or denying others.

With time the law became successful in promoting the introduction of generics; in 1983 only 35% of top-selling branded drugs with expired patents had generic competition, and only 13% of prescriptions were for generics but in 2012, 84% of prescriptions in the US were filled with generic drugs.

There have been issues with litigation incentivized by the Act.  Once the parties are in litigation, they can choose to fight the litigation to the end, or they may choose to settle the litigation.  Some of these settlements have been found to be invalid reverse payment patent settlement agreements and have been struck down in court.

The FDA has been slow to adopt regulations for the introduction of generic versions of biopharmaceutical drugs (known as "biosimilars") because the manufacturing of biopharmaceuticals is so much more complicated than small molecule drugs.  Innovator companies have emphasized those complications while generic companies, insurance companies, and consumers have advocated for the FDA to finalize their process.

References

External links
 FDA Glossary of Term in Relation to Drugs

1984 in law
United States federal patent legislation
United States federal health legislation
Biotechnology law
Drug pricing